Resham Filili is a Nepali movie which follows the friendship, dreams, hopes and deeds of Resham and Hariya - both whethered by bad luck and misfortunes, must at any cost beat the oddest odds to save their lives from Dorje's men.

Plot 
Resham Filili is a Nepali comedy film directed by Pranab Joshi. The movie was on the spotlight after the release of the title song "Jaalma" on YouTube that became an instant hit. It featured Vinay Shrestha, Karma Shakya, Kameshwor Chaurasiya and Menuka Pradhan in lead roles. The film was produced by Madhav Wagle and written and directed by Pranab Joshi.

Resham Filili was produced under the banner of actor Vinay Shrestha’s production company V Motion Pictures. This was the second venture of Vinay’s production company, VISA Girl being the first.

Cast
 Vinay Shrestha as Resham
 Menuka Pradhan as Sunita
 Kameshwor Chaurasiya as Hariya
 Karma Shakya as Bryan Rai
 Ashutosh Shrestha as Charka
 Shishir Bangdel as Dorje Don
 Samten Bhutia as Dorje

Reception
Resham Filili was released on 24 April 2015, a day before the 2015 Nepal earthquake struck. The earthquake had a huge impact on the earning and screening of the film. However, the film earned about Rs 71 lakhs gross in just one day. The film was re-released on 28 August 2015 in Nepal.

Soundtrack
The official music album of Resham Filili was launched on 15 January 2015 in Gangtok, Sikkim, graced by Sikkim’s renowned blogger (Proud To Be Sikkimese) Shital Pradhan, CEO of The White Horse Production Biren Lama and general manager Priyanka Lama and social worker Raghav Chettri. The album has four tracks and a lyrical video of the superhit song "Jaalma".

References

2015 comedy films
Arts in Nepal
Nepalese romantic comedy films